Kirsti Blom (born 1 May 1953) is a Norwegian author, raised in Hov in Søndre Land.

Career
She made her debut at the age of 20 in 1973 with the novel Bilde av et menneske (Picture of a Man). Blom has since written several novels, collections of poems and short storiesm, and a number of children's books, including non-fiction books about animals and nature in the Polarserien (Polar Series).

In 2007, Kirsti Blom and Kit M. Kovacs were nominated for the Brage Prize for the Polar Bear in the non-fiction class for children. In 2013, she was "longlisted" for the P2 listeners' novel prize for I saw everything.

The novel Kitten from 2003 is the story of a young Norwegian who goes to the Belgian Congo in the year 1900, and undergoes a development from a fairly innocent youth to an oppressor and abuser. 

Several of her novels are about artists' relationship to themselves and the world around them. In 2013 she published a novel about the Spanish painter Francisco Goya, and in 2017 came the novel Av jord , which is about the painter Jean and his attempt to withdraw completely from the rest of the world in order to paint true.

Blom lives and writes periodically in Andalusia. Both the novel Jeg så alt (I Saw Everything; 2013) and the collection of poems Den første vanlige dagen (The First Ordinary Day; 2014) draw inspiration from Andalucía and Spain.

Her books have been translated into English, Arabic, Serbian, Macedonian and Spanish.

Kirsti Blom led the foreign work in the Norwegian Writers' Association when she was a board member there from 1990 to 1996. She has also been a board member of Norwegian PEN from 1994 to 2003, where she was deputy chairman in her last year. She has since been involved in, among other things, the North Norwegian author team.

Kirsti Blom is also a writer with contributions in newspapers and magazines. She is also an art photographer and has illustrated several of her own books.

Blom has lived in Tromsø and currently lives in Oslo.

Bibliography 
 1972: Bilde av et menneske – novel
 1979: Det er bare kjærligheten som ikke sover: en roman om Randsfjordkonflikten – novel
 1984: Karameh – novel
 1992: Marianne på Galdhøpiggen – picture book for children with photographs by Per Blom (published on Tiden in collaboration with the Norwegian Tourist Association)
 1994: Breen – novel
 1996: Delta – collection of poems illustrated with own photographs
 2000: Flekker – novel (published in Serbian 2001, 2004)
 2003: Kitten – novel
 2003: Fjellreven – non-fiction, fact book for children (published in English as The Arctic Fox, 2004)
 2005: Hvalrossen – non-fiction, fact book for children
 2006: Den som svarer – novel
 2007: Isbjørnen – non-fiction, fact book for children
 2008: Snø, is og klima – non-fiction, fact book for children, Cappelen Damm
 2009: Svalbardrypa – textbook for children and young people, Cappelen Damm
 2010: Dyr i Arktis –  textbook for children and young people, Cappelen Damm 
 2011: Sjøfuglene i Arktis – non-fiction, fact book for children, Cappelen Damm
 2013: Jeg så alt: en roman om Francisco Goya – novel, October
 2014: Den første vanlige dagen – collection of poems, October
 2015: Hvitkinngåsa – textbook for children and young people, Cappelen Damm
 2016: Søppelplasten i havet – Cappelen Damm
 2017: Av jord – novel, October
 2017: Snøugla – textbook for children and young people, Cappelen Damm
 2018: Svalbardreinen – textbook for children and young people, Cappelen Damm
 2019: Søppelplasten i havet – textbook for children and young people, Cappelen Damm
 2019: Lemen – textbook for children and young people, Cappelen Damm

References

Bibliography
 «Blom, Kirsti / Norske / Forfattere / Hovedsiden - Forlaget Oktober». www.kotober.no. Visited March 12, 2017.
 «Kitten / Novels, short stories / Fiction / Books / Main page - Forlaget Oktober». www.kotober.no. Visited March 12, 2017.
 «I saw everything / Novels, short stories / Fiction / Books / Main page - Forlaget Oktober». www.kotober.no. Visited March 12, 2017.
 «Withdrawal | BOK365.no ». BOK365.no. March 11, 2017 Visited March 12, 2017.
 Kirsti Blom - Oktober Forlag

External links
 Digitaliserte bøker av Kirsti Blom hos Nasjonalbiblioteket (Digitized books by Kirsti Blom at the National Library)
 Presentasjon av Kirsti Blom i Forfatterkatalogen på Forfattersentrums nettsider (Presentation of Kirsti Blom in the Author Catalog on the Authors' Center's website)
 Digital facsimile editions of Kirsti Blom's books in the National Library
 Marianne på Galdhøpiggen, barnebok 1992 (Marianne på Galdhøpiggen, children's book 1992)
 Breen, roman 1994 (Breen, novel 1994)
 Delta, diktsamling 1996 (Delta, collection of poems 1996)
 Author pages
 Kirsti Blom in Cappelen Damm Forlag
 Kirsti Blom in NRK Forfatter

1953 births
Norwegian novelists
Norwegian children's writers
Norwegian poets
Living people